The article contains the information of 2013–14 2nd Division football season. This is the 3rd rated football competition in Iran after the Azadegan League and Persian Gulf Cup.

The league is composed of 28 teams divided into two divisions of 14 teams each, whose teams will be divided geographically.  Teams will play only other teams in their own division, once at home and once away for a total of 26 matches each.

In each division, two teams are promoted to Azadegan League, and three teams are relegated to Iran Football's 3rd Division plus the relegation playoff loser. In total, the league promotes 4 teams to Azadegan League and relegates 7 teams to 3rd Division.
The league starts in September 2013.

Teams

Group A

Group B

Standings

Group A

Group B

Relegation play-off

Payam Sanat Amol relegated to 2014–15 Iran Football's 3rd Division.

References

League 2 (Iran) seasons
3